Yetholm is the parish that contained the villages of Kirk Yetholm and Town Yetholm in the east of the former county of Roxburghshire, nowadays in the Scottish Borders.

References 

Parishes in Roxburghshire